Madura Strait is a stretch of water that separates the Indonesian islands of Java and Madura, in the province of East Java. The islands of Kambing, Giliraja, Genteng, and Ketapang lie in the Strait. The Suramadu Bridge, the longest in Indonesia, spans the strait between Surabaya on Java and Bangkalan on Madura.

In some old Western and old Indonesian sources, the strait commonly appears as Surabaya Strait (Indonesian: Selat Surabaya), but this name is not accepted in the official cartography.

Geography
The Madura Strait is located in the east of the province of northern East Java, precisely in the southwest, north, and east of the city of Surabaya; east of Sidoarjo Regency; west and south of the island of Madura; and north of the Pasuruan, Probolinggo, and Situbondo area. In this strait there are also small islands, including Kambing Island, Giliraja Island, and Genteng Island near the island of Madura, and Ketapang Island in the coastal waters of Probolinggo Regency. As a maritime waterway, the Madura strait connects various seas along the Java sea, Bali sea, and Bali strait.

A remarkable story about the origin of the Madura Strait is contained in the Javanese historical poem of Nagarakertagama, dating from circa 1365. According to the author of the poem, the strait between Java and Madura, which originally were supposedly a single island, was formed in 202 as a result of a powerful earthquake. This version does not have any scientific confirmation.

Culture and economic importance

The Madura Strait coastal community, like other coastal communities also has coastal culture, one of its cultures, is when every specific date, based on the Islamic calendar, is held a tradition called Pethik Laut, which is in the form of releasing offerings carried together and released to middle of the beach. The majority of the people's livelihoods throughout the Madura Strait coastline are fishermen and salt farmers, even the strait coastal area is also one of the largest salt producers in Indonesia.

The Madura Strait is also used as an object of tourism, industry and transportation. One of power plant industries, namely PLTU Paiton, is located on the coast of the strait, namely in the Paiton sub-district, Probolinggo Regency and is one of the largest power plants on the island of Java. Tourism objects on the Madura Strait coast, including the famous ones are Kenjeran Beach in Surabaya, Bentar Beach in Probolinggo District, and Pasir Putih Beach in Situbondo Regency.

Sea transportation facilities are ferry boats, which connect the Madura Strait on two lines, namely the connecting line Ujung Port (Surabaya) with the Port of Kamal (Bangkalan, Madura), and the connecting line Kalianget Port (Sumenep, Madura) with Pelabuhan Jangkar (Situbondo, East Java ) Other transportation facilities, namely the Suramadu Bridge is a means of land transportation connecting Java-Madura and has a very large impact on the economy of the two islands.

References

Further reading

External links 

Straits of Indonesia
Landforms of East Java
Madura Island
Landforms of Java
Greater Sunda Islands